Margub Timergalievich Ishakov (13 March 1923 – 1992) was a Chinese Tatar military officer who held several important commands in the armies of the Second East Turkestan Republic and the People's Republic of China.

Biography

Ishakov was born to an ethnic Muslim Tatar family in the Chinese city of Ghulja in 1923. A communist, Ishakov was imprisoned for two years under the regime of Sheng Shicai, after which he joined the Ili Rebellion as a political commissar. In 1945, he was appointed Chief of Staff of the Ili National Army of the Second East Turkestan Republic. Following the Incorporation of Xinjiang into the People's Republic of China in 1949, Ishakov joined the Communist Party of China and accepted a commission in the People's Liberation Army (PLA). He was eventually appointed Chief of Staff of the Xinjiang Military District and in 1955 became the youngest general in the PLA.

In 1956, the Sino-Soviet Split began, and during this period of political dispute many Tatars and ethnic Muslims in Xinjiang, including Ishakov, sided with the Soviet Union and were granted Soviet citizenship. However, Ishakov's relocation to the Soviet Union was handled legally and with few political consequences, resulting in his peaceful immigration to the Kazakh Soviet Socialist Republic in 1962.

References

1923 births
1992 deaths
People's Liberation Army generals
Chinese people of Tatar descent
Chinese emigrants to the Soviet Union
People from Yining County
Ili National Army